George A. Billings (November 22, 1870 – April 15, 1934) was an American actor noted for his portrayals of Abraham Lincoln in films of the 1920s.

Biography
Born in Minnesota in 1870, Billings became known for playing President Lincoln commencing with the 1924 film The Dramatic Life of Abraham Lincoln. He was hired for this film, despite a lack of prior acting experience, due to his close likeness to Lincoln.

In 1927, he also toured the mid-western United States playing Lincoln in a two-man play with Henry Fonda. It started out successfully, but Fonda quit due to Billings' prodigious drinking.

Filmography (all roles playing Abraham Lincoln)
 The Dramatic Life of Abraham Lincoln (1924)
 Barbara Frietchie (1924)
 The Man Without a Country (1925)
 Hands Up! (1926)
 Lincoln (1929) (10-minute sound short)

References

External links

1870 births
1934 deaths
American male film actors
American male silent film actors
20th-century American male actors